Wolverhampton East may refer to:

 the eastern area of the city of Wolverhampton in the West Midlands of England
 Wolverhampton East (UK Parliament constituency) (1885–1950)